A prison is a place of detention.  

Prison(s) or The Prison(s) may also refer to:

Film and television
 Prison (1949 film), a Swedish film by Ingmar Bergman
 Prison (1987 film), an American film directed by Renny Harlin
 The Prison (2017 film), a South Korean film
 Prison: First & Last 24 Hours, a 2015–2016 British television documentary series

Music
 The Prison: A Book with a Soundtrack, an album by Michael Nesmith, 1974
 Prisons (album), by Eyes of Fire, 2006
 "Prison" (Natalia Gordienko song), 2020
 "Prison", a song by Tom Robinson, 1985

Other uses
 The Prison (novel), a 1968 novel by Georges Simenon
 Prisons F.C., a Tanzanian football club
 Imaginary Prisons, or simply Prisons, a series of 18th-century prints by Giovanni Battista Piranesi
 The Prison, a 1929–30 cantata composed by Ethel Smyth

See also
 En prison, a roulette term
False imprisonment, a crime in common law
 Prison Oval, a Jamaican stadium
 Prison rock, pessimistic genre of Chinese rock music
 Prison Song (disambiguation)
 Spirit prison, in Latter-day Saints beliefs, a place in the spirit world
 Spirits in prison, one of the Christian concepts about the afterlife